Tastavinsaurus is a genus of sauropod dinosaur belonging to the Titanosauriformes.  It is based on a partial skeleton from the Early Cretaceous Xert Formation of Spain. The type species is Tastavinsaurus sanzi, named in honor of the Rio Tastavins in Spain and Spanish paleontologist José Luis Sanz. Tastavinsaurus sanzi is known from two specimens, one from the Xert Formation and one from the Forcall Formation. Tastavinsaurus was originally described as a somphospondylan, but it may be a brachiosaurid. The clade Laurasiformes was coined for Tastavinsaurus and its close relatives, which may include Cedarosaurus, Soriatitan, and Venenosaurus.

Description
 
The length of Tastavinsaurus sanzi has been estimated to be 16 metres (50 feet), and its weight has been estimated to be 8 tonnes. The caudal vertebrae are similar to those of other basal titanosauriforms, such as Cedarosaurus. The shin was proportionally shorter than in other sauropods, with the length of the tibia being only 55% of the length of the femur.

References

Macronarians
Early Cretaceous dinosaurs of Europe
Barremian life
Cretaceous Spain
Fossils of Spain
Fossil taxa described in 2008